Marino ( or ,) is an Italian city and comune in Lazio (central Italy), on the Alban Hills, Italy,  southeast of Rome, with a population of 37,684 and a territory of . It is bounded by other communes, Castel Gandolfo, Albano Laziale, Rocca di Papa, Grottaferrata, and Ciampino. Marino is famous for its white wine, and for its Grape Festival, which has been celebrated since 1924.

History

The territory of Marino was inhabited by Latin tribes from the 1st millennium BC. The ancient cities of Bovillae (Frattocchie), Mugilla (Santa Maria delle Mole, a frazione of the comune of Marino) and Ferentum (Marino itself) were part of the Latin League. Under the Roman Republic it was a summer resort for Roman patricians, who built luxurious villas in the area to escape the heat of Rome.

In 846 AD, Bovillae - until then the largest settlement - was destroyed by the Saracens, and the population moved to the more easily defendable area of Ferentum, which was fortified under the new name of Marinum. From 1090 it was a dominium of the Counts of Tusculum, and later a fief of the Frangipane and, beginning in 1266, the Orsini. In 1272, San Bonaventura founded the first confraternity of Italy there.

In 1347 it was besieged in vain by Cola di Rienzo. Fifty years later, it was the site of the battle between Alberico da Barbiano and the French troops supporting Antipope Clement VII. In 1419 it was bought by the Colonna, who maintained it until 1914.

Marino hosted famous historical figures, from Charles VIII of France to Alfonso II d'Este and many others. Vittoria Colonna was born in Marino in 1492 and lived there for part of her life. In 1571, Marino's people welcomed Marcantonio Colonna, a protagonist of the Battle of Lepanto, with a triumph, remembered yearly by a festival.

It was visited by the Anglo-Irish aristocrat James Caulfeild, 4th Viscount Charlemont on his mid-18th century Grand Tour; he later named his estate of Marino, Dublin after it, and built the Casino at Marino for his home.

It became part of Italy in 1870.

On 14 March 1880 the railway Rome-Ciampino-Marino was opened for service. On 1 April 1906 an electric tram line replaced the former. In 1954 the electric tram line was replaced by buses.

On 2 February 1944, during World War II, Marino was heavily bombed by USAAF B-25 aircraft from the US XII Air Force.

In 1974, Ciampino became a separate comune.

In the Due Santi district, there is the Roman campus of the University of Dallas, which opened in 1994 and is used by its students for its summer programs.

Main sights

Basilica of San Barnaba (17th century). It is in Baroque style, with an imposing façade dating to 1653, and a Latin-cross plan with a nave and two aisles. Among other works of art, it houses the Martyrdom of St. Bartholomew by Guercino and a bust of St. Anthony Abbot by Ercole Ferrata.
Church of the Santissima Trinità (1640). It houses a Mystery of the Holy Trinity, now recognized as from a pupil of Guido Reni.
Santa Maria delle Grazie. It has a single nave with side chapels. It is home to a painting of St. Roch attributed to Domenichino and, in a niche at the high altar, a fresco attributed to Benozzo Gozzoli (15th century)
Chiesa del SS. Rosario (1713), an example of Rococo art.
Palazzo Colonna (16th century)
Fontana dei Mori, depicting prisoners from the aforementioned Battle of Lepanto.
Mithraeum, with an important fresco (2nd century AD) portraying the God Mithras slaughtering the bull.

Festivals
Grape Festival (Italian: Sagra dell'uva): Every 1st Sunday of October. This festival is very famous in the surrounding area because, for about one hour, some of the city's fountains spill wine instead of water, recalling the memory of the old vintage and the historical event of the return to Marino of Marcantonio Colonna with 260 "Marinesi" from the Battle of Lepanto (7 October 1571).
Doughnut Festival (Italian: Sagra della ciambella al mosto): Every 2nd Sunday of October.  The doughnut (ring-shaped cake) made with flour, raisins and must (grape juice) is a typical product, a "marinese" cake, of limited production, only in the time of the grape harvest, a tradition based on a 17th-century recipe.

Sports
A.S.D. Città di Marino Calcio was a football club of the city. The club folded in 2013 by selling its sports title and become A.S.D. Monterotondo Calcio.

The city has another football club, known as Marino Calcio 1926.

Twin towns
 Anderlecht, Belgium
 Boulogne Billancourt, France
 Hammersmith, United Kingdom
 Neukölln, Germany
 Zaanstad, Netherlands
 Paterna, Spain
  Irving, United States 
 Nafpaktos, Greece

Famous citizens and residents
 Vittoria Colonna, poet
 Giacomo Carissimi, musician
 Alessandro Crescenzi, footballer
 Domenico Pacini, physicist
 Orlando Fanasca, footballer
 Roberta Gemma, pornographic actress
 Luca Ippoliti, futsal player
 Giuseppe Ungaretti, poet
 Umberto Mastroianni, artist
 Anton Giulio Majano (Chieti 1909 – Marino 1994), film director
 Emidio Pesce, racing driver
 Hans Werner Henze, composer
 Jacoba of Settesoli, (Torre Astura, 1190 – Assisi, 1236) disciple of St Francis of Assisi

Notes

External links

History and culture in Marino 
The sagra of Marino 

 
Cities and towns in Lazio
Castelli Romani
Mithraea